Śuddhodana (Pali: Suddhōdana), meaning "he who grows pure rice," was the father of Siddhartha Gautama, better known as the Buddha. He was a leader of the Shakya, who lived in an oligarchic republic, with their capital at Kapilavastu.

In later renditions of the life of the Buddha, Śuddhodana was often referred to as a king, though that status cannot be established with confidence and is in fact disputed by modern scholars.

Family
Sudhdhodhana king's earliest predecessor was King Maha Sammatha(or the first king of the Kalpa) A Hindu Ruler of areas of modern day Nepal. Śuddhodana's father was Sihahanu and his mother was Kaccanā.  Suddhodana's chief consort was Maha Maya, with whom he had Siddhartha Gautama (who later became known as Shakyamuni, the "Sage of the Shakyas", or the Buddha).  Maya died shortly after Siddhartha was born.  Suddhodana next elevated to chief consort Maya's sister Mahapajapati Gotami, with whom he had a second son Nanda and a daughter  Sundarī Nandā.  Both children became Buddhist monastics.

At the age of 16, Siddhartha married his cousin Yasodharā, the niece of Maha Maya and Mahapajapati.   Yasodhara's father was traditionally said to be Suppabuddha, but by some accounts it was Dandapani.

Biography

Questions of royal status 
Though frequently depicted and referenced as a king, most recent scholarship on the matter refutes the notion that Śuddhodana was a monarch.  Many notable scholars state that the Shakya republic was not a monarchy but rather an oligarchy, ruled by an elite council of the warrior and ministerial class that chose its leader or rājā.   While the rājā may have held considerable authority in the Shakya homeland, he did not rule autocratically.  Questions of consequence were debated in the governing council and decisions were made by consensus.  Furthermore, by the time of Siddharta's birth, the Shakya republic had become a vassal state of the larger Kingdom of Kosala. The head of Shakya's oligarchic council, the rājā, would only assume and stay in office with the approval of the King of Kosala.

The earliest Buddhist texts available to us do not identify Śuddhodana or his family as royals.  In later texts, there may have been a misinterpretation of the Pali word rājā, which can mean alternatively a king, prince, ruler, or governor.  Or as noted in the related article on Buddhism, "Some of the stories about Buddha, his life, his teachings, and claims about the society he grew up in may have been invented and interpolated at a later time into the Buddhist texts."

Siddhartha's birth and Great Renunciation
Siddhartha Gautama was born in Lumbini and raised in the Shakya capital of Kapilavastu.  According to legend, Śuddhodana  went to great lengths to prevent Siddhartha from becoming a śramaṇa.  But at the age of 29, after experiencing the Four Sights, Siddhartha left his home in search of spiritual answers to the unsatisfactory nature of life, leaving behind his wife Yasodharā and infant son Rāhula.  The story of Siddhartha's departure is traditionally called The Great Renunciation (Mahābhiniṣkramaṇa).

Later life
Śuddhodana  lamented his son's departure and spent considerable effort attempting to locate him. Seven years later, after word of his enlightenment reached Suddhodana, he sent nine emissaries to invite Siddhartha back to the Shakya land. The Buddha preached to the emissaries and their entourage, who joined the Sangha.

Śuddhodana  then sent a close friend of Siddhartha, Kaludayi, to invite him to return. Kaludayi also chose to become a monk, but kept his word to invite the Buddha back to his home. The Buddha accepted his father's invitation and returned to visit his home. During this visit, he preached the dharma to Suddhodana.

Four years later, when the Buddha heard of Suddhodana's impending death, he once again returned to his home and preached further to Śuddhodana at his deathbed. Finally he gained Arahantship.

References

External links

Immediate family of Shuddhodana 
Why was the Sakyan Republic Destroyed? by S. N. Goenka (The following is a translation and adaptation of a Hindi article by S. N. Goenka published by the Vipassana Research Institute in December 2003.)

Family of Gautama Buddha
Disciples of Gautama Buddha
Indian monarchs
Year of birth unknown
Year of death unknown
People from Uttar Pradesh
6th-century BC Indian monarchs
Indian Buddhist monarchs